Simplicivalva marmorata is a moth in the family Cossidae. It is found in French Guiana.

References

Natural History Museum Lepidoptera generic names catalog

Cossulinae
Moths described in 1905
Taxa named by William Schaus